Újpalota is a panel housing estate in the 15th district of Budapest, Hungary.

History

In 1969 a new panel housing estate was founded on the northeastern border of Budapest, in a wheat field and a former cemetery, near the Szilas-patak (Szilas Brook), commemorating the 50th anniversary of the Hungarian Soviet Republic (1919). It was named Újpalota (literally "Newcastle") after the adjacent village of Palota ("Castle"), which initially became a suburb of the Hungarian capital, and later part of Greater Budapest.

According to Tibor Tenke, the architect of the housing estate, the original plan was revised to increase the number of flats to 15,560. Construction was by the BHK III. (3rd Housing Factory of Budapest) using Soviet-Hungarian technology, and was completed in 1978.

Demographics

In the late 1970s Újpalota had 60,000 inhabitants from all over the country, but mostly from the poor neighbourhoods of Budapest (Józsefváros, Kőbánya, Újpest, Kispest, Angyalföld), where the slum housing was demolished. Újpalota provided these poor families with a real improvement in living conditions, including district heating, piped hot water and flush toilets. According to a 1975 survey, 70% of householders were considered to be "workers", and only 12% had passed the maturity exam, a complex exam at the end of high school in Hungary). 21% of couples raised 1 child, 46% two children and 19% three children.

According to the 2011 census, Újpalota had 33,557 inhabitants, a significant decrease since the late 1970s.

See also
 Pestújhely
 Rákospalota

References

External links 
 

15th District of Budapest
Neighbourhoods of Budapest
Urban planning in Hungary
1969 establishments in Hungary